Tommaso Bikes is a bicycle manufacturing company, headquartered in Denver, Colorado, United States. The bikes are designed in Italy, engineered in Colorado, and shipped direct to the consumer.

History
Tommaso Bicycles was founded in 1985 as a road bike brand. The direct bicycle importer, TEN SPEED DRIVE of California, commissioned the original Tommaso frames to be built in Italy and then shipped over to the USA unpainted. They used the highest quality lugged Columbus cro-moly steel tubing frames. These raw frames were painted in a two toned paint design and delivered to the bikes shops ready to build. Original color choice was either blue and white fade or pink and white fade. 
 
Since then the brand has expanded to include track bikes, fixed gear bikes, triathlon bikes and cyclocross bikes. Tommaso bicycles had a line of steel road bicycles that expanded to titanium and currently consists of aluminum and carbon road bikes. In 2013 the core of the road line is the six aluminum road bike offerings paired up with six carbon road bikes. Tommaso offers three woman specific models. The Tommaso line-up also includes an aluminum cyclocross bike and two triathlon bikes (one aluminum and one monocoque carbon).
 
In 2013 the Tommaso brand was sold to an investment group.

Products
Tommaso do not use model years, allowing for modifications and upgrades to existing bike models without having to wait an entire year.

References

External links
 Tommaso Bikes
 Giantnerd.com

Cycle manufacturers of the United States